Kurodaconus is a synonym of the  subgenus Conus (Turriconus) Shikama & Habe, 1968,n represented as Conus Linnaeus, 1758.

Distinguishing characteristics
The Tucker & Tenorio 2009 taxonomy distinguishes Kurodaconus from Conus in the following ways:
 Genus Conus sensu stricto Linnaeus, 1758
 Shell characters (living and fossil species)
The basic shell shape is conical to elongated conical, has a deep anal notch on the shoulder, a smooth periostracum and a small operculum. The shoulder of the shell is usually nodulose and the protoconch is usually multispiral. Markings often include the presence of tents except for black or white color variants, with the absence of spiral lines of minute tents and textile bars.
Radular tooth (not known for fossil species)
The radula has an elongated anterior section with serrations and a large exposed terminating cusp, a non-obvious waist, blade is either small or absent and has a short barb, and lacks a basal spur.
Geographical distribution
These species are found in the Indo-Pacific region.
Feeding habits
These species eat other gastropods including cones.
 The former genus Kurodaconus Shikama & Habe, 1968
Shell characters (living and fossil species)
The shell is pyriform with angulate shoulders and an elevated scalariform spire. The protoconch is multispiral. Nodules are obsolete. The anal notch is moderate in depth. The periostracum is smooth, and the operculum is moderate in size.
Radular tooth (not known for fossil species)
The anterior section of the radular tooth is much shorter than the posterior section, and the blade is absent. A basal spur is present, and the barb is short. There are a minimal number of serrations.
Geographical distribution
The species in this genus are found in the Indo-Pacific region.
Feeding habits
Unknown at this time.

Species list
This list of species is based on the information in the World Register of Marine Species (WoRMS) list. Species within the genus Kurodaconus include:
 Kurodaconus andremenezi (Olivera & Biggs, 2010): synonym of Conus andremenezi Olivera & Biggs, 2010
 Kurodaconus beatrix (Tenorio, Poppe & Tagaro, 2007): synonym of Conus beatrix Tenorio, Poppe & Tagaro, 2007
 Kurodaconus luciae (Moolenbeek, 1986): synonym of Conus luciae Moolenbeek, 1986
 Kurodaconus miniexcelsus (Olivera & Biggs, 2010): synonym of Conus miniexcelsus Olivera & Biggs, 2010
 Kurodaconus praecellens (A. Adams, 1855): synonym of Conus praecellens A. Adams, 1855
 Kurodaconus rizali (Olivera & Biggs, 2010): synonym of Conus rizali Olivera & Biggs, 2010
 Kurodaconus stupa (Kuroda, 1956): synonym of  Conus stupa (Kuroda, 1956)
 Kurodaconus stupella (Kuroda, 1956): synonym of  Conus stupella (Kuroda, 1956)

References

Further reading
 Kohn A. A. (1992). Chronological Taxonomy of Conus, 1758-1840". Smithsonian Institution Press, Washington and London.
 Monteiro A. (ed.) (2007). The Cone Collector 1: 1-28.
 Berschauer D. (2010). Technology and the Fall of the Mono-Generic Family The Cone Collector 15: pp. 51-54
 Puillandre N., Meyer C.P., Bouchet P., and Olivera B.M. (2011), Genetic divergence and geographical variation in the deep-water Conus orbignyi complex (Mollusca: Conoidea)'', Zoologica Scripta 40(4) 350-363.

External links
 To World Register of Marine Species
 Gastropods.com: Conidae setting forth the genera recognized therein.

Conidae